The PLK Most Improved Player Award is handed out at the end of a given regular season of the Polish Basketball League (PLK). The award was first handed out in the 2005–06 season

Winners

References

External links
Polska Liga Koszykówki - Official Site 
Polish League at Eurobasket.com

Most Improved
Most improved awards